The 2002 Shell Grand Prix of Denver was the fourteenth round of the 2002 CART FedEx Champ Car World Series season, held on September 1, 2002 on the streets of Denver, Colorado around Pepsi Center.  It was the first Champ Car event in Denver since a 1991 street course event in Denver's Civic Center.

Qualifying results

Race

Caution flags

Notes 

 New Race Lap Record Kenny Bräck 1:01.648
 New Race Record Bruno Junqueira 1:49:22.547
 Average Speed 90.349 mph

References

External links
 Friday Qualifying Results
 Saturday Qualifying Results
 Race Results

Denver
Shell Grand Prix of Denver
Centrix Financial Grand Prix of Denver